The Battle of Rhunahaorine Moss was a battle between Covenanters led by General David Leslie and Royalist forces led by Alasdair Mac Colla Chiotaich (Sir Alexander MacDonald) at Rhunahaorine Point, Kintyre, Scotland on 24 May 1647. The Covenanters defeated the Royalists.

Largie Castle at Rhunahaorine, home of the MacDonalds of Largie, was razed by the forces of General David Leslie.

Citations

References

Further reading

1647 in Scotland
Rhunahaorine Moss
Rhunahaorine Moss